Irymple Railway Station was a railway station on the Mildura railway line located between Red Cliffs and Mildura. It was opened in October 1903 when the railway was extended from Ouyen to Mildura and closed with the passenger services to Mildura in 1993. By 1904, a telegraph instrument and goods shed were provided. In 1911, the station building was destroyed by fire. In 1982, the stationmasters office, platforms and remaining facilities were placed on the Victorian Heritage Register.

References 

Disused railway stations in Victoria (Australia)